was a Japanese government official and politician before, during and after World War II. He is well known for serving as the chief secretary to Prime Minister Kantarō Suzuki's Cabinet (April–August 1945).

He was ordered by Suzuki to investigate and analyze the economic condition of Japan, and to give a written confidential report to Suzuki. Sakomizu found that Japan's resources were rapidly decreasing, and that Japan would be unable to continue fighting the war for more than a few months.  Both the air raids and the conquered Japanese territories captured by the United States of America had caused a "great disruption of land and sea communication and essential war production." In addition, coal and oil supplies were found to be in rapid decline, as well as health and support for the war effort.

He served as a government officer of the Ministry of Finance in various governmental workplaces until 1945. After WW2, he became a member of the House of Representatives and then joined Liberal Democratic Party.

References 

|-

|-

1902 births
1977 deaths
People from Tokyo
People from Kagoshima
University of Tokyo alumni
Members of the House of Representatives (Japan)
Members of the House of Councillors (Japan)
Members of the House of Peers (Japan)
Government ministers of Japan